St George's and Priorslee is  a civil parish in the borough of Telford and Wrekin, Shropshire, England. St. George's and Priorslee are suburbs of Telford.

The parish lies northeast of the Telford Town Centre and east of the town of Oakengates.

The A5 runs through the area, and junction 4 of the M54 motorway is just to the south.

The Priorslee area of Telford contains the Priorslee Campus of the University of Wolverhampton. At the centre of the Priorslee Campus is the grade II listed eighteenth century Priorslee Hall. The Priorslee area is also the site of major housing developments concentrating some of the more expensive housing in the town of Telford. There is also a primary school and a secondary school (Holy Trinity Academy).

Priorslee is also famous for the Lion public house, on the Shifnal Road behind Priorslee Village.

There is a parish council, the lowest tier of local government.

The nearest railway stations are Oakengates and Telford Central.

Naming 

The village of St George's was originally named "Pains Lane".

Priorslee is partly Latin:
prios means monk or priest 
lee is a clearing in a wood.
leasow is the area in which land was used for mainly agricultural reasons. 
priors is linked to the religious site at Priorslee. If you link the word 'Priors Leasow' together, you will find that the prior of Priorslee and St Georges was mainly  providing agricultural services.

The area named Priorslee was once in the ownership of the priors of Wombridge Priory that once stood 1½ miles to the north west.

See also
Listed buildings in St George's and Priorslee

References

Telford
Civil parishes in Shropshire